John Geddes may refer to:

 John Geddes (bishop) (1735–1799), Scottish Roman Catholic prelate
 John Geddes (politician) (1777–1828), American politician
 John Geddes (cyclist) (born 1936), British cyclist
 John M. Geddes, American journalist
 John Geddes (Dean of Niagara) (1811–1891), Canadian Anglican priest
 John Maxwell Geddes (1941–2017), Scottish composer and academic
 John Geddes (Dean of Tuam) (fl. 1889–1917), Archdeacon of Achonry and Dean of Tuam